Tendaguripterus was a genus of pterodactyloid pterosaur from the Kimmeridgian to Tithonian-age Upper Jurassic Middle Saurian Beds (Tendaguru Formation) of Tendaguru, Lindi Region, Tanzania.

Discovery and naming
During the German paleontological expeditions to German East Africa between 1909 and 1913, some pterosaur fossil material was collected that was recognized as such by Hans Reck in 1931. In 1999 David Unwin and Wolf-Dieter Heinrich named a new genus for it. The type species is Tendaguripterus recki. The genus name is derived from Tendaguru and a Latinized Greek pteron, "wing". The specific name honors Reck.

Description
The genus is based on holotype MB.R.1290, a partial mandible with teeth (the symphyseal region, where the two lower jaws meet and fuse into one element). The top of the back of the symphysis is very concave. The teeth in the posterior section of the jaw fragment point strongly backwards. They are also the longest. The teeth are set relatively far apart in alveoli with a slightly thickened ridge.  Overall, this would have been a small pterosaur; the skull length is estimated at twenty centimeters (7.9 inches), and the wingspan at around 100 cm (39.4 in). This specimen is the first report of pterosaur cranial material from Tendaguru. First described as a member of the Germanodactylidae, it was later regarded as a more general dsungaripteroid (of uncertain affinities), meaning it may have fed on crabs and other shellfish. This was mainly motivated by the somewhat raised margins of the tooth sockets. In 2007 Alexander Kellner stated that the resemblance to either Germanodactylus or Dsungaripterus was superficial and that it was not even certain it was a member of the Pterodactyloidea instead of a more basal pterosaur. He accordingly referred it to a newly named but undefined clade, the Tendaguripteridae, of which it is the only member.

See also
 List of pterosaur genera
 Timeline of pterosaur research

References

External links
Tendaguripterus in The Pterosauria

Pterodactyloids
Late Jurassic pterosaurs
Pterosaurs of Africa
Jurassic reptiles of Africa
Fossil taxa described in 1999